Daniel Martin Kearney (23 May 1921 – 19 August 1984) was an  Australian rules footballer who played with Geelong and North Melbourne in the Victorian Football League (VFL).

Family
The grandson of Geelong (VFA) footballer Daniel Michael "Nasher" Kearney (1864-1925), and the son of Geelong (VFL) footballer James Patrick Kearney (1893-1944), and Elizabeth Mary Kearney, née Lang, Daniel Martin Kearney was born at Geelong, Victoria, on 23 May 1921.

He married Catherine Iverson McLean (1919-2009) in 1944.

Death
He died at the Geelong suburb of Clifton Springs on 19 August 1984.

Notes

References
 
 World War Two Nominal Roll: Corporal Daniel Martin Kearney (VX83964/V28801), Department of Veterans' Affairs.
 B883, VX83964: World War Two Service Record: Corporal Daniel Martin Kearney (VX83964), National Archives of Australia.

External links 

1921 births
1984 deaths
Australian rules footballers from Victoria (Australia)
Geelong Football Club players
North Melbourne Football Club players